Anisoptera megistocarpa is a species of plant in the family Dipterocarpaceae. It is found in Indonesia, Malaysia, and Singapore.

References

megistocarpa
Critically endangered plants
Taxonomy articles created by Polbot